Magda Gál (married name Házi) (1907-1990), was a female Hungarian international table tennis player.

Table tennis career
She was a prolific World Table Tennis Championships medal winner and secured eight silver medals and twelve bronze medals from the 1929 World Table Tennis Championships to the 1936 World Table Tennis Championships.

Gál came short of a gold medal for two reasons; first the fact that with various doubles partners she was unable to overcome the six times world champion pairing of Mária Mednyánszky and Anna Sipos, and secondly the war effectively ended her chances to compete at world level. She did however continue to play in the United States. She also won two English Open titles.

Personal life
Gál was born into a banking family was the only woman competitor on the table tennis team at the University of Szeged.

She married her fellow international player Tibor Házi in 1937 and in 1939 they fled to the United States because of their Jewish origins and they settled in Bethesda, Maryland. She died in 1990 aged 83 and Házi died in 1999.

See also
 List of table tennis players
 List of World Table Tennis Championships medalists

References

Hungarian female table tennis players
1907 births
1990 deaths
Jewish table tennis players
American female table tennis players
World Table Tennis Championships medalists
20th-century American women
20th-century American people